The 1994–95 UMass Minutemen basketball team represented the University of Massachusetts Amherst during the 1994–95 NCAA Division I men's basketball season. The Minutemen, led by seventh year head coach John Calipari, played their home games at William D. Mullins Memorial Center and were members of the Atlantic 10 Conference. They finished the season 29–5, 13–3 in A-10 play to finish in first place.

Roster

Schedule

|-
!colspan=9| Regular season

|-
!colspan=9| 1995 Atlantic 10 men's basketball tournament

|-
!colspan=9| 1995 NCAA Division I men's basketball tournament

 Game suspended due to protest at halftime
@ Game resumed at neutral site, with score continuing from suspended game, per ruling by A-10 Commissioner

Rankings

References

UMass Minutemen basketball seasons
UMass
UMass